The Gulf of Venice is an informally recognized gulf of the Adriatic Sea. It lies at the extreme north end of the Adriatic, limited on the southwest by the easternmost point of the Po Delta in Italy and on the southeast by the southernmost point of the Istrian Peninsula in Croatia. It is bordered by the coastlines of northeastern Italy and southwestern Croatia and Slovenia.

Geography 
The gulf is not formally recognized by the International Hydrographic Organization. Under its usual informal definition, it is bound on the south by the line between Maestra Point, the easternmost point of the Po Delta in Northern Italy, and Cape Kamenjak, the southernmost point of the Istrian Peninsula in Croatia. It is bound on all other sides by the northern shore of the Adriatic.

The Tagliamento, Piave, Adige, Isonzo, Dragonja, and Brenta Rivers flow into the Gulf of Venice. The major cities along its coast are Venice, Trieste, Koper, Chioggia, and Pula. An important tourist destination in the area is the island of Albarella.

History 

In antiquity the gulf was southern terminus of Amber Road. The importance of the Republic of Venice during the High Middle Ages, Renaissance, and Early Modern Italy gave the name of the Gulf of Venice to the entire Adriatic Sea. The term was limited to the area around Venice as the Latin name for the sea became more common in English and among other European geographers.

See also 
 Gulf of Trieste
 Venetian Lagoon

References

Citations

Bibliography
 .

Venice
Venice
Geography of Venice
Venice
Venice
Istria
Bays of the Adriatic Sea